Stepas Butautas (alternate spellings: Stiepas, Butaustas) (25 August 1925 – 22 March 2001 in Kaunas) was a Soviet and Lithuanian professional basketball player and coach. He trained at the VSS Žalgiris, in Kaunas. He played with the Soviet Union men's national basketball team at the 1952 Summer Olympic Games, where he won a silver medal. During the tournament, he played in all eight games.

He was named one of FIBA's 50 Greatest Players in 1991.

Playing career

Club playing career
Butautas started his career with Dinamo Kaunas in 1944. He then played with ASK Kaunas in 1945, before returning to Dinamo Kaunas in 1946. He played with Žalgiris Kaunas, from 1947 to 1956. 

With Zalgiris, he won the USSR Premier Basketball League championship in 1947 and 1951. He also won 6 Lithuanian SSR championships (1945, 1950, 1952, 1953, 1954, 1955).

National team playing career
Butautas was a member of the Soviet Union men's national basketball team, from 1947 to 1954. With the Soviet Union, he won gold medals at the EuroBasket 1947, the EuroBasket 1951, and the EuroBasket 1953. He also won a silver medal at the 1952 Summer Olympic Games.

Coaching career

Clubs
After he retired from playing basketball, Butautas began a career working as a basketball coach. On the club level, he was the head coach of Politechnika Kaunas women's team, from 1960 to 1966. He was then the head coach of Žalgiris Kaunas, from 1975 to 1979.

Soviet Union women's national team
Butautas was the head coach of the Soviet Union women's national basketball team, from 1958 to 1964. He led them to gold medals at the 1959 FIBA World Championship for Women, and the 1964 FIBA World Championship for Women. He also won gold medals at the EuroBasket Women 1960, the EuroBasket Women 1962, and the EuroBasket Women 1964. He also won the silver medal at the EuroBasket Women 1958.

Cuba national team
Butautas was also the head coach of the Cuba men's national basketball team, from 1967 to 1968, and in 1970. He coached Cuba at the 1967 CentroBasket, the 1968 Summer Olympic Games, and at the 1970 FIBA World Championship.

Managerial career
Butautas was the department head of the Lithuanian State Institute of Physical Education (now Lithuanian Sports University), from 1978 to 1985. He was the President of the Lithuanian SSR Basketball Federation, from 1959 to 1961. He was also the Chairman of the Lithuanian SSR Basketball Coaches Commission, from 1980 to 1989.

Personal life
His son, Ramūnas Butautas, was the head coach of the Lithuania men's national basketball team.

See also 
 List of EuroBasket Women winning head coaches

References

External links
FIBA Profile 1
FIBA Profile 2
Sports-Reference.com Profile

1925 births
2001 deaths
Communist Party of the Soviet Union members
Honoured Masters of Sport of the USSR
Knight's Crosses of the Order of the Lithuanian Grand Duke Gediminas
Merited Coaches of the Soviet Union
Recipients of the Order of the Red Banner of Labour
Basketball players at the 1952 Summer Olympics
BC Žalgiris coaches
BC Žalgiris players
FIBA EuroBasket-winning players
Lithuanian basketball coaches
Lithuanian men's basketball players
Medalists at the 1952 Summer Olympics
Olympic basketball players of the Soviet Union
Olympic medalists in basketball
Olympic silver medalists for the Soviet Union
Basketball players from Kaunas
Soviet basketball coaches
Soviet men's basketball players